This is a list of ski areas and resorts in Asia and Eurasia.

Armenia
Ashotsk
Jermuk
Lernanist
Tsaghkadzor Ski Resort

Azerbaijan
Shahdag Mountain Resort
Tufandag Ski Resort

China
Beidahu, Jilin
Genting Resort Secret Garden, Hebe
Nanshan Ski Village, Beijing
Xiaohaituo Alpine Skiing Field, Yanqing
Songhuahu, Jilin
Wanlong Ski Resort, Hebei
Xiling Snow-capped Mountain, Chengdu
Yabuli Ski Resort, Heilongjiang
Thaiwoo Resort, Hebei

Georgia
Bakuriani
Goderdzi Pass
Gudauri
Mestia

India
Himachal Pradesh
Kufri
Manali
Narkanda

Uttarakhand
Auli
Dayara Bugyal
Mundali

Sikkim
Lachung
Yumthang

Jammu and Kashmir
Gulmarg
Pahalgam

Arunachal Pradesh
Tawang

Iran

 Abali
 Alvares
 Andabil
 Chelgerd (Kuhrang)
 Darbandsar
 Dizin
 Fereydunshahr
 Kakan
 Kaman
 Khor
 Khoshakoo
 Nasar
 Papaei
 Pooladkaf
 Saggez
 Sahand
 Shahmirzad
 Shazand
 Shemshak
 Shirbad
 Tarikdarreh
 Tochal
 Yam

Israeli-occupied territories
 Mount Hermon ski resort

Japan

Kazakhstan
Akbulak
Almatau
Shymbulak
Tabagan

Korea, North
Begaebong, Samjiyŏn district
Masikryong Ski Resort, Kangwon Province

Korea, South

Kyrgyzstan
Chon Tash
Karakol
Orlovka

Lebanon
 The Cedars
 Faqra 
 Mzaar Kfardebian
 Laqlouq
 Qanat Bakich
 Zaarour

Mongolia
 Sky Resort

Pakistan
Azad Jammu & Kashmir
Arang Kel

Gilgit Baltistan
Astore Valley
Fairy Meadows
Karakoram
Naltar ski resort
Rattu
Shimshal

Khyber Pakhtunkhwa
Malam Jabba ski resort
Nathia Gali

Russia (Asian territory)
Dombay, Karachay-Cherkessia
Gora Moroznaya, Kamchatka Oblast
Gorny Vozdukh, Yuzhno-Sakhalinsk, Sakhalin Oblast
Rosa Khutor Alpine Resort, Krasnodar Krai
Sheregesh, Kemerovo Oblast

Syria
Bloudan

Tajikistan
Safed Dara (formerly Takob)

Turkey
Ağrı-Güneykaya
Bayburt-Kop Dağı
Bingöl-Yolçatı
Bitlis-Çirtkaya
Bolu-Arkut
Bozdağ
Davraz
Elazığ-Hazarbaba
Elmadağ
Erciyes Ski Resort
Gümüşhane-Zigana
Ilgaz
Karçal (Saçinka)
Kartalkaya
Kartepe
Palandöken Mountain
Saklıkent
Sarıkamış
Nemrut
Uludağ

Turkmenistan
Kopet Dag

United Arab Emirates
 Ski Dubai

Uzbekistan
Chimgan

Asia
Ski
Skiing in Asia
Ski